Anarhichas minor, the spotted wolffish, spotted sea cat or leopardfish, is a large marine fish of the family Anarhichadidae. This bottom-dwelling species is found across the North Atlantic and adjacent parts of the Arctic Ocean from north of Russia and the Scandinavian Peninsula to the Scotian Shelf, off Nova Scotia, Canada. In Canada the population declined by about 90% from the late 1970s through the early 1990s, particularly in the northern part of its range.  In Canada it is classified as a threatened species.

Taxonomy
Anarhichas minor was first formally described in 1772 by the Icelandic explorer, writer and conservator of the Icelandic language Eggert Ólafsson with the type locality given as Iceland. It is one of four species of wolffishes in the genus Anarhichas. The specific name minor should mean "smaller" or "lesser", however Olafsson meant it to be "latter" as this was the second wolffish species to be described.

General description 

Similar species 
The spotted wolffish can be distinguished from the northern (A. denticulatus) and Atlantic wolffish (A. lupus) by its dark spots.

Distribution 
Spotted wolffish occur in the Arctic Ocean and on both sides of the North Atlantic Ocean from Labrador to the Barents Sea. Its northern limit in Canada is Baffin Bay, although its presence is rare. In the western North Atlantic, it is found off east and west Greenland, on the Labrador Shelf and Grand Banks and less commonly on the Scotian Shelf.

This species has been caught as far south as Scotland and Ireland.

Habitat and life history 
They prefer a coarse sand and sand/shell hash bottom with rocky areas nearby for shelter and nest-building. Spawning occurs in summer to late fall/early winter. Growth rate is slower for this species than for the Atlantic and northern wolffish (Barents Sea). Fish become mature at seven years of age or older and can live to 21 years. The species does not form large schools and migrations are local and limited.

Diet 
The diet of this fish consists primarily of hard-shelled invertebrates found on the bottom, such as crustaceans and mollusks. Echinoderms, tube worms, seaweeds and fish have also been reported in the gut contents of the spotted wolffish.

Conservation status 
This species has been identified as threatened by the Committee on the Status of Endangered Wildlife in Canada (COSEWIC). It is listed under the Canadian federal Species at Risk Act and was afforded protection under it as of June 2004. The IUCN assess it as Near Threatened in Europe.

Threats 
Overfishing and habitat alteration are believed to have played a role in the observed declines in wolffish abundance. In Canadian waters, this species is not targeted by the fishing industry, but bycatch mortality by offshore trawlers and long-liners is considered a threat. In addition, activities that disturb the ocean bottom, such as trawling, may damage spawning habitat.

References

Further reading
Scott and Scott 1988; Stock Status Report 2004/031 2003.

External links
View video clip of a wolffish

Endangered fish
minor
Fish of the Atlantic Ocean
Fish described in 1772
Taxa named by Eggert Ólafsson